Shatin is a village and the centre of the Yeghegis Municipality of the Vayots Dzor Province in Armenia. The village contains several archeological sites from various periods in Armenian history.

Toponymy 
The village was previously known as Shatik, Hesan Kand, Gasankend and Hasankand.

Nature 
The village is home to the only mountain goat observation point in Armenia. The observation point was constructed with the help of the Norwegian and Armenian governments, the World Wildlife Fund and Safari organisations.

Gallery

References

External links 

 

Populated places in Vayots Dzor Province